George Leigh or Lye (by 1530 – 1578) was an English politician.

Life 
He was a Member (MP) of the Parliament of England for Shrewsbury in March 1553, November 1554, 1558, 1559, 1571 and 1572, and for Ripon in 1563.

References

1578 deaths
Year of birth uncertain
English MPs 1553 (Edward VI)
English MPs 1554–1555
English MPs 1558
English MPs 1559
English MPs 1563–1567
English MPs 1571
English MPs 1572–1583